The BPD was a British 4-wheeled cyclecar made in 1913 by Brown, Paine and Dowland Ltd of Shoreham-by-Sea, Sussex.

The car was powered by a JAP air-cooled, V twin engine rated at 8 hp and drive was to the rear wheels through a 2-speed gearbox and belts. It is not known if more than a prototype was made.

See also
 List of car manufacturers of the United Kingdom

References 

Cyclecars
Defunct motor vehicle manufacturers of England
Vehicle manufacturing companies established in 1913
Companies based in West Sussex